Matthews Run is a  long 2nd order tributary to Brokenstraw Creek.  It is classed as a cold water fishery by the Pennsylvania Fish and Boat Commission.

Variant names
According to the Geographic Names Information System, it has also been known historically as:  
Hazeltine Hollow Run
Mathews Run

Course
Matthews Run rises in Warren County, Pennsylvania about 0.5 miles northeast of Pikes Rocks and flows southeast to meet Brokenstraw Creek at Youngsville.

Watershed
Matthews Run drains  of the Pennsylvania High Plateau province and is underlaid by the Venango Formation and the Corry Sandstone through Riceville Formation. The watershed receives an average of 45.0 in/year of precipitation and has a wetness index of 378.67.  The watershed is about 69% forested.

See also 
 List of rivers of Pennsylvania

References

Rivers of Pennsylvania
Tributaries of the Allegheny River
Rivers of Warren County, Pennsylvania